The 2000–01 season was Juventus Football Club's 103rd in existence and 99th consecutive season in the top flight of Italian football.

Season review
Juventus just came up short in Serie A for the second year in a row. Unlike in 2000, it did not have matters in its own hands prior to the final game of the season, and even though Juventus fended off Atalanta 2–1 at home, Roma beat Parma 3–1, which meant the title landed with a Roman club for the second year running.

The determining moment of the title race had been a showdown between Juventus and Roma at the Stadio delle Alpi with six games to go, and the Bianconeri closing down on the Romans who had suffered a recent dip in their form. In front of their crowd, Juventus began the brightest. Two goals in quick succession by Alessandro Del Piero and Zinedine Zidane gave them a lead they held on to until the 79th minute, when Edwin van der Sar took center stage. The Dutch goalkeeper fumbled a long-range effort from Roma's Japanese midfielder Hidetoshi Nakata, enabling the latter to score a fortunate goal. In added time, Vincenzo Montella equalized for the Roman club, thus denying Juventus a vital victory.

La Vecchia Signora did win all five of its remaining games after that, but in the meantime, Roma did enough to make sure they didn't lose the top spot of the table, thus winning their first scudetto since 1983. The success was celebrated wildly in the streets of the Italian capital, and the fact that Roma had beaten bitter rivals Juventus to the title made the supporters even happier.

In the Champions League, Juventus was a major disappointment, getting knocked out in the first group stage of the tournament. It was the first time in the club's history that it had been knocked so early in the competition. This performance put Carlo Ancelotti's position at the helm under even more threat. Ancelotti had already been associated in the previous season with the club's worst run in any European competition since the 1987–88 season. As a man who had been associated with Juve's rivals Milan, Roma and Parma for most of his footballing career, he had never been a popular choice with the fans, with frequent doubts being raised about his lack of concern for the club's declining fortunes.

In the summer of 2001, wholesale changes were made. Marcello Lippi returned to his old job prior to the 2001–02 season. It was also Zinedine Zidane's last season with Juventus as he was sold for a world record fee to Real Madrid, but the Italian club compensated his loss with four new players during the summer, with Gianluigi Buffon and Lilian Thuram coming from Parma, and Pavel Nedvěd and Marcelo Salas came from Lazio.

Players

Squad information

Transfers

Winter

Competitions

Serie A

League table

Results summary

Results by round

Matches

Coppa Italia

Round of 16

UEFA Champions League

Group stage

Statistics

Players statistics

Goalscorers
  David Trezeguet 14
  Filippo Inzaghi 11 (1)
  Alessandro Del Piero 9 (2)
  Zinedine Zidane 6 (1)
  Igor Tudor 6
  Darko Kovačević 5
  Antonio Conte 3
  Gianluca Zambrotta 3

References

Juventus F.C. seasons
Juventus